The Dictionary of American Naval Aviation Squadrons (DANAS) is a multivolume work published by Naval Historical Center of the U.S. Department of the Navy's Naval History & Heritage Command. It covers naval aviation in much the same way as the Dictionary of American Naval Fighting Ships (DANFS) covers commissioned vessels.

Two volumes have been published to date: Volume 1, covering the history of attack and strike fighter squadrons, and Volume 2, covering the history of patrol squadrons. Other volumes are forthcoming.

The squadron histories are quite detailed, typically including sections on lineage, insignia and nickname, chronology of significant events, home port assignments, commanding officers, aircraft assigned, major overseas deployments, airwing assignments, and unit awards received.

DANAS volumes are available online and as PDF files on CD-ROM.

Publication data
Volume 1 (1995) includes about 140 histories and other data covering every squadron in the attack (VA, VAH, VAK, VAL, and VAP) and strike fighter (VFA) communities from the time the first of these commands was established in 1934, through the publication of this volume in 1995. There are seven appendixes, including such things as technical information and drawings for aircraft assigned to the squadrons covered, carrier deployments by year, and lineage listings for the squadrons. A glossary, bibliography, and index are also included. The information was compiled by Roy A. Grossnick, the head of the Naval Historical Center's Naval Aviation History Office.

Volume 2 (2000) contains 154 histories covering every patrol squadron (VP, VPB, VP(H) and, VP(AM)) in existence between 1922 and 2000. Fourteen appendixes cover technical information on patrol aircraft, submarines sunk by patrol squadrons, air-to-air claims for Navy and Marine Corps patrol aircraft during World War II, a listing of patrol squadron shore bases, etc. A glossary, bibliography, and index are also included.

This book provides an opportunity to learn about the origins, achievements, and traditions of patrol aviation as it relates to the naval heritage of the United States. It was written by a professional historian and retired Navy Captain Michael D. Roberts.

Subsequent volumes in the series will cover other components of U.S. naval aviation. In 2000, the staff of the History & Heritage Command's Aviation History Branch was in the early stages of work on Volume 3, containing the histories and lineage of all U.S. Navy fighter squadrons.

Reference use
Because the DANAS is a work of the U.S. government, its content is in the public domain, and the text is often quoted verbatim in other works.

See also
 List of squadrons in the Dictionary of American Naval Aviation Squadrons
 List of United States Navy aircraft squadrons
 List of inactive United States Navy aircraft squadrons

References

External links
 Viewable and downloadable version of DANAS Volume 1 (581 pages, 7.7 MB PDF file)
These are links to PDF files that are shorter and more manageable subsets of the complete volume:
Table of Contents of DANAS Volume 1, with links to PDF files of individual chapters, appendixes and sections
Title page, About the Author, Contents, Foreword, Preface and Acknowledgements
Chapter 1 The Evolution of Aircraft Class and Squadron Designation Systems
Chapter 2 Attack Squadron Histories for VA-1E to VA-23
Chapter 2 Attack Squadron Histories for VA-34 to VA-38
Chapter 2 Attack Squadron Histories for VA-42 to VA-52
Chapter 2 Attack Squadron Histories for VA-54 to VA-56
Chapter 2 Attack Squadron Histories for VA-64 to VA-75
Chapter 2 Attack Squadron Histories for VA-76 to VA-104
Chapter 2 Attack Squadron Histories for VA-105 to VA-122
Chapter 2 Attack Squadron Histories for VA-125 to VA-153
Chapter 2 Attack Squadron Histories for VA-154 to VA-174
Chapter 2 Attack Squadron Histories for VA-175 to VA-209
Chapter 2 Attack Squadron Histories for VA-210 to VA-873
Chapter 3 Heavy Attack Squadron Histories (VAH) VAH-8 to VAH-123
Chapter 4 Tactical Aerial Refueling Squadron Histories (VAK) VAK-208 to VAK-308
Chapter 5 Light Attack Squadron History (VAL)
Chapter 6 Heavy Photographic Squadron Histories (VAP) VAP-61 to VAP-62
Chapter 7 Strike Fighter Squadron Histories for VFA-15 to VFA-81
Chapter 7 Strike Fighter Squadron Histories for VFA-82 to VFA-106
Chapter 7 Strike Fighter Squadron Histories for VFA-113 to VFA-147
Chapter 7 Strike Fighter Squadron Histories for VFA-151 to VFA-195
Chapter 7 Strike Fighter Squadron Histories for VFA-203 to VFA-305
Appendix 1 Aircraft Data-Technical Information and Drawings, A-3 to AM
Appendix 1 Aircraft Data-Technical Information and Drawings, BG to F9F (F-9)
Appendix 1 Aircraft Data-Technical Information and Drawings, F/A-18 to TC-4C
Appendix 2 Aircraft Carrier Listing for CV, CVB, CVA, CVAN, CVN, CVL, and CVE Designations
Appendix 3 Carrier Deployments by Year (1946 to 1990)
Appendix 4 U.S. Navy Squadron Designations and Abbreviations
Appendix 5 How to Trace Squadron Lineage
Appendix 6 Lineage Listing for VA, VA(AW), VAH, VA(HM), VAK, VAL, VAP, and VFA Designated Squadrons
Appendix 7 Types of Aircraft Listed in the Squadron Histories

 Viewable and downloadable version of DANAS Volume 2 (847 pages, 18.2 MB PDF file)
These are links to PDF files that are shorter and more manageable subsets of the complete volume:
Table of Contents of DANAS Volume 2, with links to PDF files of individual chapters, appendixes and sections
Title page, About the Author, Contents, Foreword, Preface and Acknowledgements
Chapter 1 Origins of Navy Patrol Aviation, 1911 to 1920s
Chapter 2 Guidelines for Navy Aviation Squadron Lineage and Insignia
Chapter 3 Patrol Squadron (VP) Histories (1st VP-1 to 2nd VP-4)
Chapter 3 Patrol Squadron (VP) Histories (2nd VP-5 to 2nd VP-8)
Chapter 3 Patrol Squadron (VP) Histories (2nd VP-9 to 3rd VP-17)
Chapter 3 Patrol Squadron (VP) Histories (3rd VP-18 to 1st VP-22)
Chapter 3 Patrol Squadron (VP) Histories (3rd VP-22 to 3rd VP-25)
Chapter 3 Patrol Squadron (VP) Histories(2nd VP-26 to 1st VP-29)
Chapter 3 Patrol Squadron (VP) Histories (2nd VP-29 to 1st VP-40)
Chapter 3 Patrol Squadron (VP) Histories (2nd VP-40 to 3rd VP-45)
Chapter 3 Patrol Squadron (VP) Histories (VP-46 to 2nd VP-48)
Chapter 3 Patrol Squadron (VP) Histories (VP-49 to 3rd VP-61)
Chapter 3 Patrol Squadron (VP) Histories (1st VP-62 to VP-90)
Chapter 3 Patrol Squadron (VP) Histories (2nd VP-91 to VP-133)
Chapter 3 Patrol Squadron (VP) Histories (VP-142 to VP-153)
Chapter 4 Patrol Bombing Squadron (VPB) Histories (VPB-1 to VPB-16)
Chapter 4 Patrol Bombing Squadron (VPB) Histories (VPB-17 to VPB-29)
Chapter 4 Patrol Bombing Squadron (VPB) Histories (VPB-33 to VPB-54)
Chapter 4 Patrol Bombing Squadron (VPB) Histories (VPB-61 to VPB-103)
Chapter 4 Patrol Bombing Squadron (VPB) Histories (VPB-105 to VPB-118)
Chapter 4 Patrol Bombing Squadron (VPB) Histories (VPB-121 to VPB-141)
Chapter 4 Patrol Bombing Squadron (VPB) Histories (VPB-145 to VPB-203)
Chapter 4 Patrol Bombing Squadron (VPB) Histories (VPB-206 to VPB-216)
Chapter 5 Heavy Patrol Squadrons (Landplane) (VP-HL) Histories
Chapter 6 Amphibian Patrol Squadrons (VP-AM) Histories
Appendix 1: Aircraft Data—Technical Information and Drawings – (DT to P3M1/2)
Appendix 1: Aircraft Data—Technical Information and Drawings – (P4M Mercator to PV-2 Harpoon)
Appendix 2: A Summary of Patrol Aircraft Ordnance Equipment
Appendix 3: Submarines Sunk by Patrol Aircraft During World War II
Appendix 4: Air to Air Claims and Credits for Navy and Marine Corps Patrol Type Aircraft During World War II
Appendix 5: Seaplane Tender Listings
Appendix 6: Patrol Squadron Shore Establishments
Appendix 7: Lineage Listings for VP, VB, VPB, VP(HL), VP(ML), VP(MS), and VP(AM) Squadrons
Appendix 8: Listing of Reserve VP Squadrons, February 1946 to January 1968
Appendix 9: Medal of Honor Recipients for Patrol Aviation
Appendix 10: Patrol Squadron Korean War Deployments
Appendix 11: Patrol Squadron Vietnam Deployments (1964-1972)
Appendix 12: Patrol Squadron Persian Gulf Deployments (1990-1991)
Appendix 13: Organization and Deployment of Patrol Wings (Fleet Air Wings) 1918-Present
Appendix 14: Reserve Patrol Squadron Call-Ups in the Post-WWII Period
Glossary
Bibliography
Index of Patrol Squadron Histories and Aircraft Data

 United States Naval Aviation 1910-2010
 Naval History and Heritage Command website



Encyclopedias of the military
United States naval aviation
United States Navy publications
Naval History and Heritage Command